Willie B. Norwood (born August 8, 1947) is a retired American professional basketball player.

A 6'7" power forward from Carrollton, Mississippi and Alcorn State University, Norwood played in the National Basketball Association from 1971 to 1978 as a member of the Detroit Pistons, Seattle SuperSonics, and Portland Trail Blazers. He averaged 7.5 points per game in his NBA career.

Notes

1947 births
Living people
African-American basketball players
Alcorn State Braves basketball players
American expatriate basketball people in France
American men's basketball players
Basketball players from Mississippi
Caen Basket Calvados players
Detroit Pistons draft picks
Detroit Pistons players
People from Carrollton, Mississippi
Portland Trail Blazers players
Power forwards (basketball)
Rochester Zeniths players
Seattle SuperSonics players
Small forwards
21st-century African-American people
20th-century African-American sportspeople